The Seattle Architecture Foundation is a non-profit, 501(c)(3) organization. The foundation is located in Seattle, Washington, and is governed by a Board of Directors, with programs funded by donors and implemented by volunteers. SAF offers youth programming, annual exhibits, special events, and walking tours of downtown Seattle and surrounding neighborhoods.

External links
 Seattle Architecture Foundation website

Non-profit organizations based in Seattle
Architecture organizations based in the United States
Architecture groups